Koff may refer to:

 Koff (beer), a Finnish beer brewed by Sinebrychoff
 Koff (coffee substitute), a coffee substitute
 Clea Koff (British-born American forensic anthropologist) (born 1972)
 Offutt Air Force Base (ICAO code KOFF)
 Koff (ship type), a historical type of sailing vessel in the North Sea